This article contains the discography of American singer Eartha Kitt.

Albums

Studio albums 
RCA Victor releases 1952 to 1959
 1952: Leonard Sillman's New Faces Of 1952 (Original Cast) (as cast member) (LOC1008; 12-inch)
 1953: RCA Victor Presents Eartha Kitt (with Henri René and His Orchestra) (LPM-3062; 10-inch)
 1954: That Bad Eartha (10-inch, 8-song album) (with Henri René and His Orchestra) (LPM-3187; 10-inch)
 1954: Leonard Sillman presents Mrs. Patterson (Original Cast Recording) (as starring cast member)
 1955: Down to Eartha (with Henri René and His Orchestra) (LPM-1109; 12-inch)
 1956: That Bad Eartha (12-inch compilation from 1953-54 10-inch albums) (with Henri René and His Orchestra) (LPM-1183; 12-inch)
 1957: Thursday's Child (with Henri René and His Orchestra) (LPM-1300)
 1958: St. Louis Blues (with Shorty Rogers and His Orchestra) (LPM-1661)

Kapp Records releases 1959 to 1960
 1959: The Fabulous Eartha 
 1960: Revisited

MGM Records release 1962
 1962: Bad But Beautiful

EMI Columbia releases 1963 to 1965
 1962: The Romantic Eartha
 1965: Love for Sale (with Tony Osborne and His Orchestra) (SCX-3563)

Decca Records release 1965
 1965: Canta en Español/Sings In Spanish

Caedmon Records releases 1968
 1968: Folk Tales of the Tribes Of Africa
 1968: Black Pioneers in American History (with Moses Gunn) 

Spark Records release 1970
 1970: Sentimental Eartha

Can't Stop Productions release 1984
 1984: I Love Men

Swing Disques release 1985
 1985: Eartha Kitt, Doc Cheatham, Bill Coleman, with George Duvivier & Co. (FR; SW8410) [album features four previously unreleased tracks from a Paris recording session in 1950; the original, unreleased 1950 performing credit was "Eartha Kitt with Doc Cheatham & His Trio"]

Ariola Records releases 1989 to 1990
 1989: I'm Still Here

ITM Records releases 1991 to 1992
 1991: Thinking Jazz

DRG Records release 1994
 1994: Back in Business

West Wind Records release 2000
1999: Thinking Jazz

Live albums
MGM Records release 1962
 1962 Bad But Beautiful / The Most Exciting Woman in the World

EMI Columbia releases 1963 to 1965
 1963 C'est Si Bon, Live in Tivoli

GNP Crescendo release 1965
 1965 Eartha Kitt Live at the Plaza

Ariola Records releases 1989 to 1990
 1990: Live in London

ITM Records releases 1991 to 1992
 1992: Standards/Live

Kulter Video release 1994
 1994-1995: The Most Exciting Women in the World (1994 VHS) (1995 CD)

DRG Records release 2006
 2006 Live from the Cafe Carlyle

Strike Force Entertainment release 2008
 2008 Live at the Cheltenham Jazz Festival

Extended play albums
 1954: That Bad Eartha
 1954: Sings Songs from "New Faces" 
 1955: Down to Eartha (U.S.; RCA; EPB1109)  [re-issued in 1960]
 1956: Just an Old Fashioned Girl (U.S.; RCA; EPA 9053)
 1956: Thursday's Child (U.S.; RCA; EPA-844)
 1956: Gold N Kitt (SWE; RCA; EPS 157) (two Swedish songs, two instrumentals with Gold's orchestra)
 1959: Gold ´n' Kitt (DE; RCA; EPS 157) [German re-issue of Gold N Kitt]
 1959: That Blue Eartha  (U.K.; RCA; SRC-7015) [EP version of St. Louis Blues]
 1959: Just Eartha (DE; RCA; RCX-138)
 1960: Revisited

Singles

Charted singles

Complete list of singles
 1952: "Tierre va Tembla" / "Caliente" (U.S.; SEECO; SR-8242)
 1952: "Monotonous" / "Boston Beguine" (U.S.; RCA; 47-4952)
 1953: "Uska Dara – A Turkish Tale" / "Two Lovers" (U.S.; RCA; 47-5284)
 1953: "C'est Si Bon"/ "African Lullaby" (U.S.; RCA; 47-5358)
 1953: "I Want to Be Evil" / "Annie Doesn't Live Here Anymore" (U.S.; RCA; 20-5442)
 1953: "Santa Baby" / "Under The Bridges Of Paris" (with Henri René and His Orchestra) (U.S.; RCA; 247-5502)
 1954: "Lovin' Spree" / "Somebody Bad Stole de Wedding Bell" (U.S.; RCA; 20-5610)
 1954: "Let's Do It" / "Senor" (U.S.; RCA; 47-5737)
 1954: "Mink Shmink" /  "Easy Does It" (U.S.; RCA; 47-5756)
 1954: "Apres Moi" / "I Wantcha Around" (U.S.; RCA; 47-5776)
 1954: "If I Was a Boy" / "Tea in Chicago" (U.S.; RCA; 5882)
 1954: "Hey Jacques" / "(This Year's) Santa Baby" (U.S.; RCA; 47-5914)
 1955: "Freddy" / "Sweet And Gentle"  – with Perez Prado (U.S.; RCA Victor; 47-6138 )
 1955: "Under the Bridges of Paris" / "Let's Do It" (U.K.; RCA; 47-1014)
 1955: "The Heel" / "My Heart's Delight" (U.S.; RCA; 47-6009)
 1955: "Do You Remember" / "Mambo de Paree" (U.S.; RCA; 47-6197)
 1955: "Sho-Jo-Ji (The Hungry Raccoon)" / "Nobody Taught Me" (U.S.; RCA; 47-6245)
 1956: "I'm a Funny Dame" / "Put More Wood on the Fire" (U.S.; RCA; 47-6267)
 1956: "Rosenkyssar" / "Vid kajen" (SWE; RCA on 7-inch vinyl and 78 rpm) (both songs in Swedish. Re-released on a Swedish EP in 1959; it sold better there)
 1955: "Nothin' for Christmas" / "Je Cherche un Homme (I Want a Man)" (U.S.; RCA; 47-6319)
 1956: "Honolulu Rock & Roll" / "There is No Cure for L'Amour" (U.S.; RCA; 47-6521)
 1957: "A Woman Wouldn't Be a Woman" / "Toujour Gai" (U.S.; RCA; 47-6928)
 1957: "Take My Love, Take My Love" / "Yomme Yomme" (U.S.; RCA; 47-7013)
 1957: "If I Can't Take It With Me" / "Proceed With Caution" (U.S.; RCA; 47-7118)
 1958: "Just An Old-Fashioned Girl" / "If I Can't Take It With Me (When I Go)" (U.K.; RCA; 1087)
 1959: "Sholem" / "Love is a Gamble" (U.S.; Kapp; 294)
 1960: "I Wantcha Around" / "Johnny with the Gentle Hands" (U.S.; Kapp; 333)
 1961: "No Second Chance" / "You're My Man" (DE; RCA; 47-9525)
 1962: "A Lady Loves" / "Please Do It Again" (U.K.; MGM; 1153)
 1962: "Good Little Girls" / "Diamonds Are a Girl's Best Friend" (U.K.; MGM; 1178)
 1962: "It's So Nice to Have a Man Around the House" / "Lola Lola" (AU; Columbia; DO4414)
 1963: "Mack the Knife" / "Tierra va Tembla" (U.S.; Kapp; 10 246 AU)
 1963: "Little White Lies" / "An Englishman Needs Time" (U.K.; Columbia; Db 4985)
 1963: "Lola Lola" / "I Had a Hard Day Last Night" (U.S.; RCA; DB7170)
 1965: "The Art of Love" / "Nikki" (U.S.; Brunswick; 05937)
 1965: "Any Way You Want It Baby / There Comes a Time" (U.S.; Musicor; MU 1220)
 1965: "Chez Moi" / "When the World was Young" (U.K.; HMV; 1401)
 1968: "Che Vale Per Me" / "Eccomi" (IT; CDI; CDI 2021)
 1971: "A Knight for My Nights" / "Summer Storm" (U.K.; RCA; CBS S 7626)
 1971: "Gib mir deine Hände" / "Ein Sommertraum" (DE; Spark; 14685AT)
 1972: "Catch the Wind" / "Hurdy Gurdy Man" (DE; Spark; 14 572 AT)
 1983: "Where Is My Man" (U.S.; Streetwise; SWRL 221)
 1984: "I Love Men" (NL; High Fashion Music; MS 128)
 1986: "I Don't Care" (FR; Scorpio Music; 885 233-1)
 1986: "This Is My Life" (DE; Metronome; 883 791-1ME )
 1987: "Arabian Song" (U.K.; Quazar Records; QUAT 1)
 1989: "Cha Cha Heels" (Eartha Kitt and Bronski Beat) (DE; Ariola; 662 213 )
 1989: "Primitive Man" (Ariola; 612 713)
 1994: "Where Is My Man (Remix 94')" (DE; Blow Up; INT 125.645)
 1994: "If I Love Ya Then I Need Ya, If I Need Ya Then I Wantcha Around" (U.K.; RCA; 20-5776)
 1998: "Where Is My Man '98" (DE; ZYX Music; ZYX 8857-8 )
 2000: "Where Is My Man (Joe T. Vanelli Remix)" (U.S.; Groovilicious; GM 225)
 2001: "This Is My Life (Eartha Kitt vs. Joe T. Vannelli)" (IT; Dream Beat; DB 154)

References

External links
 
Globalproductions.info
Retrospective-records.co.uk
Polyhex.com

 
Discographies of American artists
Vocal jazz discographies
Pop music discographies